Tour de Serbie is a road bicycle race held annually in Serbia. First held in 1939, since 2005 it has been ranked 2.2 on the UCI Europe Tour.

Past winners

References

External links

UCI Europe Tour races
Cycle races in Serbia
Recurring sporting events established in 1939
1939 establishments in Yugoslavia
Summer events in Serbia